Romeyn is a Dutch given name and surname. Among variant forms are Romeijn, Romein, Romijn and Romyn, each pronounced  in Dutch. Romein means "Roman", and the given name could be considered cognate to Romeo. The surname's origin may thus be patronymic or toponymic, indicating someone from Rome. Sometimes the name is a spelling change from Remein, which started as a patronymic based on the given name Remy / Remigius. Notable people with the name include:

Given name
Romeyn B. Ayres (1825–1888), Union Army general in the American Civil War
Romeyn Berry (1881–1957), American sports administrator and author
Romeyn de Hooghe (1645–1708), Dutch painter, sculptor, engraver and caricaturist
Romeyn Beck Hough (1857–1924), American physician and botanist best known for creating The American Woods
As a middle name
Theodric Romeyn Beck (1791–1855), American physician specializing in medical jurisprudence
John Romeyn Brodhead (1814–1873), American historical scholar
Charles Romeyn Dake (1849–1899), American homeopathic physician and writer
Elizabeth Romeyn Elwyn (1922–2002), American-born architect
Ned Romeyn Healy (1905–1977), member of Congress from 1945 to 1947
Theodoric Romeyn Westbrook (1821–1885), U.S. Representative from New York

Surname
Annie Romein-Verschoor (1895–1978), Dutch author and historian, wife of Jan
Charles Romeyn (1874–1950), American football player and United States Army officer
Charles W. Romeyn (died 1942), American architect
 (1929–2008), Dutch linguist and author
Hennie de Romijn (born 1968), Dutch football defender
Henry Romeyn (1833-1913), American Army officer and Medal of Honor recipient
Jan Romein (1893–1962), Dutch historian, journalist and literary scholar, husband of Annie
John le Romeyn (died 1296), mediaeval Archbishop of York
Luke Romyn (born 1975), Australian action thriller author
Piet Romeijn (born 1939), Dutch football defender
Rebecca Romijn (born 1972), American actress and model
Willem Romeyn (1624–1693), Dutch landscape painter

See also
Romen (disambiguation)

References

Dutch masculine given names
Dutch-language surnames
Patronymic surnames